The Murray River Council is a local government area in the Riverina region of New South Wales, Australia. This area was formed in 2016 from the merger of Murray Shire with Wakool Shire.

The combined area comprises  and covers the northern bank of the Murray River and hinterland from Moama downstream to Tooleybuc.

Main towns and villages

The largest town in Murray River Council is Moama in the far south east. Other towns and localities in the area include Barham, Bunnaloo, Burraboi, Caldwell, Cunninyeuk, Koraleigh, Kyalite, Mathoura, Moulamein, Murray Downs, Speewa, Tantonan, Tooleybuc, Wakool and Womboota.

Heritage listings
The Murray River Council has a number of heritage-listed sites, including:

 Barham, 319 Main Road: Barham Bridge over Murray River
 Cunninyeuk, 94 Noorong Road  (Main Road): Gee Gee Bridge over Wakool River
 Moama, Hunt Street: Moama Historic Precinct
 Swan Hill, 386 Main Road: Coonamit Bridge over Wakool River
 Swan Hill, 67 Main Road (East): Swan Hill-Murray River Road Bridge
 Tooleybuc, 222 Main Road: Tooleybuc Bridge
 Wakool, Moulamein Highway: Murray Downs Homestead

Demographics

Council
The Administrator of the Murray River Council from 2016 to September 2017 was David Shaw.

Murray River Council has nine Councillors elected proportionally from three wards - Moama, Greater Murray and Greater Wakool. All Councillors are elected for a fixed four-year term of office.

The most recent election was held on 9 September 2017, and the makeup of the Council by order of election is as follows:

Main towns in shire

In 2021 census the shire had a population of 12,850.

See also

 Local government areas of New South Wales

References

 
Local government areas of New South Wales
Local government areas of the Riverina
2016 establishments in Australia